Omalonyx unguis is a species of air-breathing land snail, a terrestrial pulmonate gastropod mollusc in the family Succineidae, the amber snails.

Distribution
The distribution of Omalonyx unguis includes:

 Argentina
Brazil
Paraguay

References

Succineidae
Gastropods described in 1837